Treneé McGee is an American Democratic Party politician currently serving as a member of the Connecticut House of Representatives from the 116th district, which includes parts of the cities of New Haven and West Haven since 2021. McGee was elected to the seat in December 2021 in a special election following the arrest and subsequent resignation of Michael DiMassa. She is a graduate of Marymount Manhattan College. Before being elected to the Connecticut House she served on the West Haven city council.

Political views
McGee is an advocate of a consistent life ethic, opposing abortion, capital punishment, and euthanasia. She was one of two signatories of a letter circulated by Democrats for Life advocating for the return of the 2000 Democratic Party platform's acknowledgment of a diversity of opinion on abortion. In 2022, McGee raised objections to House Bill 5414, signed by Governor Ned Lamont and aimed at expanding access to abortions, arguing that black people have been targeted by the abortion industry. She has stated that banning abortion would not be a priority for her as a state representative, instead seeking to implement policies to lessen demand for abortions.

McGee says she supports "quality health care for everyone" and believes that "students should be able to go to college and not be in debt for the rest of their lives."

References

External links

- Representative information

Living people
Democratic Party members of the Connecticut House of Representatives
People from West Haven, Connecticut
Marymount Manhattan College alumni
21st-century African-American politicians
21st-century American politicians
21st-century American women politicians
Women state legislators in Connecticut
African-American women in politics
African-American state legislators in Connecticut
American anti-abortion activists
Year of birth missing (living people)